Rollatini (sometimes also spelled rolatini or rolletini) is an Italian-style dish (called rollatini di melanzane in faux Italian) that is usually made with thin slices of eggplants, which are dusted in wheat flour or lightly breaded and covered with ricotta and often other cheeses and seasonings, then rolled up and baked. Alternatively, veal, chicken, or fish may be used in place of the eggplant.

Rollatini is not an actual Italian word; in Italy the dish is known as involtini (e.g., involtini di melanzane).

See also
 Braciola
 Chicken piccata
 Eggplant parmesan
 List of eggplant dishes
 List of Italian dishes
 Scaloppine

References

External links
Eggplant rollatini recipe from Everyday Italian, by Giada de Laurentiis

Beef dishes
Italian chicken dishes
Italian-American chicken dishes
Eggplant dishes
Italian cuisine
Italian-American cuisine
Baked foods